Seattle, Washington, has more than 400 permanent pieces of public artwork throughout the city, supported by private collections and the municipal Percent for Art program, which directs one percent of funding for capital improvement projects into artwork. In 2013, the collection's permanent and portable works were valued at a total of $39 million.

Sculpture

 A Sound Garden (1982–1983), Douglas Hollis
 Adam
 Adjacent, Against, Upon (1976)
 American Doughboy Bringing Home Victory (1932), Alonzo Victor Lewis
 Angie's Umbrella (2003)
 Birthplace of Seattle Monument (1905)
 Black Sun  (1969), Isamu Noguchi
 Broken Obelisk, Barnett Newman
 Bust of Edvard Grieg, Finn Frolich
 Bust of Mark A. Matthews (1941), Alonzo Victor Lewis
 Centennial Fountain (Seattle University)
 Changing Form
 Chief of the Suquamish – Chief Seattle (1909), James A. Wehn
 Dancer with Flat Hat, Phillip Levine
 Dancer's Series: Steps (1979), Jack Mackie and Charles Greening
 The Electric Lady Studio Guitar, Daryl Smith
 The Emperor Has No Balls
 Fallen Firefighters Memorial (1998), Hai Ying Wu
 Farmer's Pole (1984)
 Fremont Rocket
 Fremont Troll (1990)
 Hammering Man (1991), Jonathan Borofsky
 Hat 'n' Boots
 Henry M. Jackson
 Historic Chinatown Gate
 Homeless Jesus
 International Fountain
 Ivar Feeding the Gulls (1988)
 Jet Kiss (2015), Mike Ross
 Kobe Bell
 Lady Rainier
 Loo Wit
 Lundeberg Derby Monument
 Made in USA (2005), Michael Davis
 Mirall (2015)
 Moss Turtle (2021), Michiko Tanaka
 Nine Spaces Nine Trees Olympic Iliad Pioneer Square Totem Pole
 Prefontaine Fountain Rachel The Red Popsicle (2011)
 Statue of Sadako Sasaki, Peace Park
 Sasquatch Pushing Over a House Seattle Center Totem (1970)
 Seattle Fishermen's Memorial Seattle George Monument Seattle Monolith Shear Draft (1995)
 Sonic Bloom (2013), Dan Corson
 Statue of Chief Seattle (1912), James Wehn
 Statue of Chris Cornell (2018), Seattle Center
 Statue of Don James
 Statue of Elvis Presley
 Statue of George Washington (1909), Lorado Taft
 Statue of John McGraw (1912), Richard E. Brooks
 Statue of Lenin
 Statue of Liberty Statue of Sun Yat-sen
 Statue of William H. Seward
 Straight Shot (2007)
 Thomas Burke Monument Three Piece Sculpture: Vertebrae Typewriter Eraser, Scale X United Confederate Veterans Memorial
 Untitled (Lee Kelly, 1975)
 Untitled (Shapiro, 1990), Seattle University
 Untitled Totem Pole (1984)
 Urban Garden Waiting for the Interurban The Wall of Death Waterfront Fountain (1974)
 Waterworks Wind CradleOlympic Sculpture Park
The following artworks have been installed in Olympic Sculpture Park:

 Bunyon's Chess Curve XXIV Eagle (1971), Alexander Calder
 Echo Eye Benches I, II and III Father and Son (2005), Louise Bourgeois
 Love & Loss Neukom Vivarium Perre's Ventaglio III Persephone Unbound Riviera Schubert Sonata Seattle Cloud Cover Sky Landscape I Split Stinger Untitled (McMakin)
 Wake Wandering Rocks''

Murals

West Seattle has 11 outdoor murals that were created in the early 1990s and restored in 2018. Black Lives Matter street murals were painted in Capitol Hill and outside Seattle City Hall in 2020 and 2021, respectively.

See also
 AIDS Memorial Pathway

References

Seattle
 

Seattle
Public art